Lake Pomacocha may refer to:

 Lake Pomacocha (Ayacucho), a lake in the region of Ayacucho, Peru.
 Lake Pomacocha (Pasco), a lake in the region of Pasco, Peru.
 Another name for Lake Pomacochas, a lake in the region of Amazonas, Peru.